, abbreviated as Sandai Jitsuroku, is an officially commissioned Japanese history text. Completed in 901, it is the sixth and final text in the Six National Histories series. It covers the years 858–887.

Background

Following the earlier national history Nihon Montoku Tennō Jitsuroku (879), Emperor Uda ordered the compilation of the years since then. It was compiled by Fujiwara no Tokihira, Sugawara no Michizane, Ōkura no Yoshiyuki, and Mimune no Masahira. The text was completed in 901.

Contents

Written in Kanbun-style and contained within fifty volumes, the contents cover a span of thirty years from 858 to 887 corresponding to three imperial reigns: Seiwa, Yōzei, and Kōkō. It contains many imperial edicts and is more detailed compared to the earlier texts. Particularly famous is a description of Ariwara no Narihira. Parts of volumes 15, 19, and 48 are incomplete.

Also described is an earthquake in July 869 and a tsunami that flooded the plains of northeast Japan: “The sea soon rushed into the villages and towns, overwhelming a few hundred miles of land along the coast. There was scarcely any time for escape, though there were boats and the high ground just before them. In this way about 1,000 people were killed.” These were the same plains that were submerged in the 2011 Tōhoku earthquake and tsunami, according to one account. "Analysis of sediments left by the 869 tsunami led to an estimate that the earthquake had a magnitude of 8.3."<ref>Chang, Kenneth, "Blindsided by Ferocity Unleashed by a Fault", The New York Times, web p. 2, March 21, 2011 (March 22, 2011 p. D1 NY ed.). Retrieved 2011-03-21.</ref>

Final National HistoryNihon Sandai Jitsuroku is the final text in the Six National Histories series. In 936, a national history bureau (撰国史所) was established to maintain the existing national histories as well as to continue with their compilation. A new text, Shinkokushi, was begun. However, it remained in draft form and was never completed. The declining power of the Ritsuryō institution is cited as a cause.

See also

 Ruijū Kokushi, a categorized and chronological history text of the Six National Histories; valuable for reconstructing incomplete sections of Nihon Sandai Jitsuroku''.

Notes

References

External links 
Text of the Nihon Sandai Jitsuroku (Japanese)

Late Old Japanese texts
10th-century history books
History books about Japan
9th century in Japan
Sugawara no Michizane
10th-century Japanese books
History books of the Heian Period